The Rivière à Grignon (English: Grignon's River) is a tributary of lac Saint-Jean, flowing in the municipality of Chambord, in the Le Domaine-du-Roy Regional County Municipality, in the administrative region of Saguenay–Lac-Saint-Jean, in the province of Quebec, to Canada.

The upper part of the Grignon river valley is served by forest roads and Chemin Delaunière which connects by the southeast to route 155; the lower part by Principale Street (route 169).

Generally, forestry is the main economic activity in the upper part of this valley; agriculture is practiced in the lower part.

The surface of the Grignon river is usually frozen from the beginning of December to the end of March, except the rapids; however, traffic on the ice is generally safe from mid-December to mid-March.

Geography 
The Grignon river originates from an unidentified lake. This lake takes the form of a birch leaf. The mouth of Lac Brassard is located southeast of the lake, either:
  south-east of downtown Roberval;
  south-west of the village center of Chambord;
  south of the mouth of the Grignon river.

  first towards the northwest to the outlet (coming from the northwest) of an unidentified lake;
  first towards the east, in particular by crossing Lake Delaunaire, to its mouth;
  first forming a hook towards the east, then the northeast by approaching a curve of the railway, to a stream (coming from the southwest);
  to the north in the agricultural zone by crossing the route 169 and the railway, collecting a stream (coming from the southeast), until 'at its mouth.

The Grignon river flows at the bottom of Anse de Chambord, on the southwest shore of lac Saint-Jean. The confluence of the river at Grignon is located at:

  south-east of the tip of Pointe-Chambord;
  west of the center of the village of Chambord;
  south-east of downtown Roberval.

Toponymy 
The term "Grignon" is a family name of French origin.

The toponym "Rivière à Grignon" was formalized on September 5, 1985, at the Place Names Bank of the Commission de toponymie du Québec.

Notes and references

Appendices

Related articles 
 Le Domaine-du-Roy Regional County Municipality
 Chambord, a municipality
 Lac Saint-Jean, a body of water
 Saguenay River, a stream

External links 

Rivers of Saguenay–Lac-Saint-Jean
Le Domaine-du-Roy Regional County Municipality